The hooded crow (Corvus cornix), also called the scald-crow or hoodie, is a Eurasian bird species in the genus Corvus. Widely distributed, it is found across Northern, Eastern, and Southeastern Europe, as well as parts of the Middle East. It is an ashy grey bird with black head, throat, wings, tail, and thigh feathers, as well as a black bill, eyes, and feet. Like other corvids, it is an omnivorous and opportunistic forager and feeder.

The hooded crow is so similar in morphology and habits to the carrion crow (Corvus corone) that for many years they were considered by most authorities to be geographical races of one species. Hybridization observed where their ranges overlapped added weight to this view. However, since 2002, the hooded crow has been elevated to full species status after closer observation; the hybridisation was less than expected and hybrids had decreased vigour. Within the hooded crow species, four subspecies are recognized, with one, the Mesopotamian crow, possibly distinct enough to warrant species status itself.

Taxonomy
The hooded crow was one of the many species originally described by Carl Linnaeus in his landmark 1758 10th edition of Systema Naturae; he gave it the binomial name Corvus cornix. Linnaeus specified the type locality as "Europa", but this was restricted to Sweden by the German ornithologist Ernst Hartert in 1903. The genus name Corvus is Latin for "raven" while the specific epithet cornix is Latin for "crow". The hooded crow was subsequently considered a subspecies of the carrion crow for many years, hence known as Corvus corone cornix, due to similarities in structure and habits. "Hooded crow" has been designated as the official name by the International Ornithologists' Union (IOC). It is locally known as a 'hoodie craw' or simply 'hoodie' in Scotland and as a grey crow in Northern Ireland. It is also known locally as  "Scotch crow" and "Danish crow". In Irish, it is called , or the "grey crow", as its name also means in the Slavic languages and in Danish. It is referred to as the "mist crow" in German, and the "dolman crow" in Hungarian.

Subspecies
Four subspecies of the hooded crow are now recognised; previously, all were considered subspecies of Corvus corone. A fifth subspecies, C. c. sardonius (Kleinschmidt, 1903) has been listed, although it has been alternately partitioned between C. c. sharpii (most populations), C. c. cornix (Corsican population), and the Middle Eastern C. c. pallescens. 

 C. c. cornix Linnaeus, 1758 – the nominate race, occurs in Britain, Ireland and the rest of Europe south to Corsica.
 C. c. sharpii Oates, 1889 – named for English zoologist Richard Bowdler Sharpe. This is a paler grey form found from western Siberia through to the Caucasus region and Iran.
 C. c. pallescens (Madarász, 1904)  – found in Turkey and Egypt, and is a paler form as its name suggests.
C. c. capellanus Sclater, PL, 1877 – sometimes considered a separate species. This distinctive form occurs in Iraq and southwestern Iran. It has very pale grey plumage, which looks almost white from a distance. It is possibly distinct enough to be considered a separate species.

Genetic difference from carrion crows
 The hooded crow (Corvus cornix) and carrion crow (Corvus corone) are two closely related species whose geographical distribution across Europe is illustrated in the accompanying diagram. It is believed that this distribution might have resulted from the glaciation cycles during the Pleistocene, which caused the parent population to split into isolates which subsequently re-expanded their ranges when the climate warmed causing secondary contact. Jelmer Poelstra and coworkers sequenced almost the entire genomes of both species in populations at varying distances from the contact zone to find that the two species were nearly genetically identical, both in their DNA and in its expression (in the form of mRNA), except for the lack of expression of a small portion (<0.28%) of the genome (situated on avian chromosome 18) in the hooded crow, which imparts the lighter plumage colouration on its torso. Thus the two species can viably hybridize, and occasionally do so at the contact zone, but the all-black carrion crows on the one side of the contact zone mate almost exclusively with other all-black carrion crows, while the same occurs among the hooded crows on the other side of the contact zone. They concluded that it was only the outward appearance of the two species that inhibits hybridization.

Description
Except for the head, throat, wings, tail, and thigh feathers, which are black and mostly glossy, the plumage of the hooded crow is ash-grey, with the dark shafts giving it a streaky appearance. The bill and legs are black; the iris dark brown. Only one moult occurs, in autumn, as in other crow species. Male hooded crows tend to be larger than females, although the two sexes are otherwise similar in appearance. Their flight is slow, heavy and usually straight. When first hatched, the young are much blacker than the parents. Juveniles have duller plumage with bluish or greyish eyes, and initially possess a red mouth.

The hooded crow, with its contrasted greys and blacks, is visually distinct from both the carrion crow and the rook, but the  call notes of the hooded and carrion crows are almost indistinguishable.

Distribution

The hooded crow breeds in northern and eastern Europe, and closely allied forms inhabit southern Europe and western Asia. Where its range overlaps with that of the carrion crow, as in northern Britain, Germany, Denmark, northern Italy, and Siberia, their hybrids are fertile. However, the hybrids are less well-adapted than purebred birds (one of the reasons behind its reclassification as a distinct species from the carrion crow). Little or no interbreeding occurs in some areas, such as Iran and central Russia.

In the British Isles, the hooded crow breeds regularly in Scotland, the Isle of Man, and the Scottish Islands; it also breeds widely in Ireland. In autumn, some migratory birds arrive on the east coast of Britain. In the past, this was a more common visitor.

Behaviour

Diet

The hooded crow is omnivorous, with a diet similar to that of the carrion crow, and is a constant scavenger. It drops molluscs and crabs to break them after the manner of the carrion crow, to the point that an old Scottish name for empty sea urchin shells was "crow's cups". On coastal cliffs, the eggs of gulls, cormorants, and other birds are stolen when their owners are absent, and hooded crows will enter the burrows of puffins to steal eggs. It will also feed on small mammals, scraps, smaller birds, and carrion. The hooded crow often hides food to feed on later, especially meat, nuts, and any insects that may be present on these, in places such as rain gutters, flower pots, or in the earth under bushes. Other crows will often watch a crow that hides food and then search the hiding place later when the first crow has left.

Nesting

Nesting occurs later in colder regions: mid-May to mid-June in northwest Russia, Shetland, and the Faroe Islands, and late February in the Persian Gulf region. In warmer parts of the European Archipelago, the clutch is laid in April. The bulky stick nest is normally placed in a tall tree, but cliff ledges, old buildings, and pylons may be used. Nests are occasionally placed on or near the ground. The nest resembles that of the carrion crow, but on the coast, seaweed is often interwoven in the structure, and animal bones and wire are also frequently incorporated. The altricial young are incubated for 17–19 days by the female alone, that is fed by the male. They fledge after 32 to 36 days. Incubating females have been reported to obtain most of their own food and later that for their young.

The typical lifespan is unknown, but that of the carrion crow is four years. The maximum recorded age for a hooded crow is 16 years, and 9 months.

This species is a secondary host of the parasitic great spotted cuckoo, the European magpie being the preferred host. However, in areas where the latter species is absent, such as Israel and Egypt, the hooded crow becomes the normal corvid host.

This species, like its relative, is regularly killed by farmers and on grouse estates. In County Cork, Ireland, the county's gun clubs shot over 23,000 hooded crows in two years in the early 1980s.

Status
They are not believed to approach the thresholds for the population decline criterion of the IUCN Red List (i.e., declining more than 30% in ten years or three generations), so are evaluated as least concern. The carrion crow and hooded crow hybrid zone is slowly spreading northwest, but the hooded crow has on the order of three million territories in just Europe (excluding Russia). This movement is also attested to by the fact that in April 2020 the hooded crow was redlisted in Sweden, where the Species Information Centre does distinguish between hooded and carrion crow.

Cultural significance
In Irish folklore, the bird appears on the shoulder of the dying Cú Chulainn, and could also be a manifestation of the Morrígan, the wife of Tethra, or the Cailleach. This idea has persisted, and the hooded crow is associated with fairies in the Scottish highlands and Ireland; in the 18th century, Scottish shepherds would make offerings to them to keep them from attacking sheep. In Faroese folklore, a maiden would go out on Candlemas morn and throw a stone, then a bone, then a clump of turf at a hooded crow – if it flew over the sea, her husband would be a foreigner; if it landed on a farm or house, she would marry a man from there, but if it stayed put, she would remain unmarried.

The old name of Royston crow originates from the days when this bird was a common winter visitor to southern England, with the sheep fields around Royston, Hertfordshire providing carcasses on which the birds could feed. The local newspaper, founded in 1855, is called The Royston Crow, and the hooded crow also features on the town's coat of arms.

The hooded crow is one of the 37 Norwegian birds depicted in the Bird Room of the Royal Palace in Oslo. Jethro Tull mentions the hooded crow on the song "Jack Frost and the hooded crow" as a bonus track on the digitally remastered version of Broadsword and the Beast and on their The Christmas Album.

In January 2014, a hooded crow and a yellow-legged gull each attacked one of two peace doves which Pope Francis had allowed children to release in Vatican City.

References

External links

 Cyberbirding: hooded crow pictures
 Profile shot of bird
 Skull of hooded crow (without beak sheath) 
 Video of wild hooded crow in Warsaw trying to imitate human speech
 Educational article with video about Hooded Crow

hooded crow
hooded crow
Birds of Europe
Birds of Western Asia
hooded crow
hooded crow
Articles containing video clips
Taxobox binomials not recognized by IUCN